Poa sieberiana, commonly known as grey tussock-grass and snow grass, is a species of tussock grass that is endemic to Australia.

The species was formally described in 1827 by German botanist Kurt Sprengel in Systema Vegetabilium.

References

sieberiana
Bunchgrasses of Australasia
Poales of Australia
Flora of the Australian Capital Territory
Flora of New South Wales
Flora of Queensland
Flora of South Australia
Flora of Tasmania
Flora of Victoria (Australia)